{{Infobox election
| election_name = 1956 French legislative election
| country = France
| type = parliamentary
| ongoing = no
| previous_election = 1951 French legislative election
| previous_year = 1951
| next_election = 1958 French legislative election
| next_year = 1958
| seats_for_election = All 595 seats to the French National Assembly  298 seats were needed for a majority
| election_date = 2 January 1956
| turnout = 82.8% ( 2.6 pp)
| image1 = 
| leader1 = Maurice Thorez
| party1 = French Communist Party
| leaders_seat1 = Seine
| last_election1 = 103 seats
| seats1 = 150
| seat_change1 =  47
| popular_vote1 = 5,514,403
| percentage1 = 25.36%   
| image2 =  
| leader2 = none
| party2 = National Centre of Independents and Peasants
| leaders_seat2 = none
| last_election2 = 96 seats
| seats2 = 95
| seat_change2 =  1
| popular_vote2 = 3,259,782
| percentage2 = 14.99%
| image3 = 
| leader3 = Guy Mollet
| party3 = French Section of the Workers International
| leaders_seat3 = Pas-de-Calais
| last_election3 = 107 seats
| seats3 = 95
| seat_change3 =  12
| popular_vote3 = 3,247,431
| percentage3 = 14.93%

| image4 = 
| leader4 = 
| party4 = Popular Republican Movement
| leaders_seat4 = 
| last_election4 = 95 seats
| seats4 = 83
| seat_change4 =  12
| popular_vote4 = 2,366,321
| percentage4 = 10.88%

| image5 =  
| colour5 = FFBF00
| leader5 = Pierre Mendès France (Radical),  René Pleven (UDSR)
| party5 = Radical-UDSR
| leaders_seat5 = Eure (Mendès France),  Côtes-du-Nord (Pleven)
| last_election5 = New party
| seats5 = 77
| seat_change5 = N/A
| popular_vote5 = 2,389,163 
| percentage5 = 10.99%

| image6 = 
| colour6 = 704214
| leader6 = Pierre Poujade
| party6 = UFF
| leaders_seat6 = 
| last_election6 = New party| seats6 = 52 
| seat_change6 =  52
| popular_vote6 = 2,744,562
| percentage6 = 12.62%

| title              = Prime Minister
| before_election    = Edgar Faure
| before_party       = Radical Party (France)
| after_election     = Guy Mollet
| after_party        = French Section of the Workers International
}}

French legislative elections to elect the third National Assembly of the Fourth Republic took place on 2 January 1956 using party-list proportional representation. The elections had been scheduled for June 1956; however, they were brought forward by Edgar Faure using a constitutional sanction.

The previous legislative elections in 1951 had been won by the Third Force, a coalition of center-left and center-right parties, but it was divided about denominational schools question and, when faced with the colonial problem, the governments had gradually moved towards the right. A part of the Rally of the French People (RPF), the Gaullist party, joined the majority in opposing the leadership of Charles de Gaulle, who then retired.

The defeat in the Battle of Dien Bien Phu in May 1954 caused a political crisis. The Radical Pierre Mendès-France became leader of the cabinet and ended the First Indochina War. He also began the process of independence for Morocco and Tunisia, but from November 1954 on, France was confronted by the Algerian War. In February 1955, Mendès-France was replaced, at the head of the cabinet, by his rival in the Radical Party, Edgar Faure. This one led a more repressive policy in Algeria.

The far-right, led by Pierre Poujade, re-appeared at about the same time. He was a critic of "fiscalism", and leader of a shopkeepers and craftsmen's movement. Many voters seemed tired of the political system's numerous ministerial crises, and he had much support in the rural areas, which were in decline.
 
The anticipated legislative elections took place when Faure was defeated by the National Assembly. Even though the French Communist Party re-emerged as the country's most popular party (for the last time in its history), it did not join the government. A coalition was formed behind Mendès-France and advocated a peaceful resolution of the Algerian conflict. This Republican Front was composed of the French Section of the Workers' International (SFIO, socialist party) of Guy Mollet, the Radical Party of Pierre Mendès-France, the Democratic and Socialist Union of the Resistance of François Mitterrand and the National Centre of Social Republicans of Jacques Chaban-Delmas. Faure was excluded from the Radical Party – in response he transformed the Rally of the Republican Lefts (which had been abandoned by those groups which had now joined the Republican Front) into a party that he led, and he campaigned with the center-right parties. 
The French Communist Party remained the largest party and the Republican Front obtained a relative majority in order to end the Algerian War.

The Poujadists won 52 seats versus predictions of six to eight, and the press stated that they held the balance of power. Media reception was mixed, with the result welcomed by communist supporters and condemned by papers such as The Times, Le Figaro, and The Saturday Evening Post.

The coalition cabinet was led by the Socialist leader Guy Mollet. At the beginning he was also supported by the Communists, but pressure from the pieds-noir in Algeria incited him into leading a very repressive policy against the Algerian nationalists. This policy was criticized by Vice-Prime Minister Mendès-France and other members of the cabinet, who resigned, thus splitting the Republican Front. Mollet and his successors floundered in the conflict until May 1958.

Results

|-
! style="background-color:#E9E9E9;text-align:left;vertical-align:top;" colspan=2 |Parties and coalitions
! style="background-color:#E9E9E9;text-align:right;" | Abbr.
! style="background-color:#E9E9E9;text-align:right;" | Votes
! style="background-color:#E9E9E9;text-align:right;" | %
! style="background-color:#E9E9E9;text-align:right;" | Seats
! style="background-color:#E9E9E9;text-align:right;" | +/- %
|-
|style="background-color:#1E90FF"|
| style="text-align:left;" | National Centre of Independents and Peasants (Centre national des indépendants et paysans)
| style="text-align:right;" | CNIP
| style="text-align:right;" | 3,259,782
| style="text-align:right;" | 15.30
| style="text-align:right;" | 95
| style="text-align:right;" | +1.66
|-
|style="background-color:#00CCCC"|
| style="text-align:left;" | Popular Republican Movement (Mouvement républicain populaire)
| style="text-align:right;" | MRP
| style="text-align:right;" | 2,366,321
| style="text-align:right;" | 11.11
| style="text-align:right;" | 83
| style="text-align:right;" | -1.49
|-
|style="background-color:#FBEC5D"|
| style="text-align:left;" | Rally of Left Republicans (Rassemblement des gauches républicaines)
| style="text-align:right;" | RGR
| style="text-align:right;" | 838,321
| style="text-align:right;" | 3.94
| style="text-align:right;" | 14
| style="text-align:right;" | -6.23
|-
|style="background-color:#C9A0DC"|
| style="text-align:left;" | National Centre of Social Republicans outside Republican Front(Centre national des républicains sociaux)
| style="text-align:right;" | CNRS
| style="text-align:right;" | 585,764 		
| style="text-align:right;" | 2.75
| style="text-align:right;" | 22
| style="text-align:right;" | -17.98
|-
|
| style="text-align:left;" | Total "Centre-Right"
|
| style="text-align:right;" | 7,050,188
| style="text-align:right;" | 33.10
| style="text-align:right;" | 214
|-
|style="background-color:#E75480"|
| style="text-align:left;" | French Section of the Workers' International (Section française de l'Internationale ouvrière)
| style="text-align:right;" | SFIO
| style="text-align:right;" | 3,247,431
| style="text-align:right;" | 15.25
| style="text-align:right;" | 95
| style="text-align:right;" | -0.14
|-
|style="background-color:#FFBF00"|
| style="text-align:left;" | Radical Party (Parti radical) and Democratic and Socialist Union of the Resistance (Union démocratique et socialiste de la Résistance)
| style="text-align:right;" | PR/UDSR
| style="text-align:right;" | 2,389,163
| style="text-align:right;" | 11.22
| style="text-align:right;" | 77
| style="text-align:right;" | +1.05
|-
|style="background-color:#C9A0DC"|
| style="text-align:left;" | National Centre of Social Republicans (Centre national des républicains sociaux)
| style="text-align:right;" | CNRS
| style="text-align:right;" | 256,587 	
| style="text-align:right;" | 1.20
| style="text-align:right;" | 0
| style="text-align:right;" | -20.73
|-
|
| style="text-align:left;" | Total "Republican Front"
|
| style="text-align:right;" | 5,893,181
| style="text-align:right;" | 27.67
| style="text-align:right;" | 172
|-
|style="background-color:#FF0000"|
| style="text-align:left;" | French Communist Party (Parti communiste français)
| style="text-align:right;" | PCF
| style="text-align:right;" | 5,514,403 	
| style="text-align:right;" | 25.89
| style="text-align:right;" | 150
| style="text-align:right;" | -0.38
|-
|style="background-color:#704214"| 
| style="text-align:left;" | Union and French Fraternity (Union et fraternité française'')
| style="text-align:right;" | UFF
| style="text-align:right;" | 2,744,562
| style="text-align:right;" | 12.88
| style="text-align:right;" | 52
| style="text-align:right;" | +12.88
|-
|
| style="text-align:left;" | Miscellaneous
|
| style="text-align:right;" | 98,600
| style="text-align:right;" | 0.46
| style="text-align:right;" | 7
|-
|
| style="text-align:left;" | Total
|
| style="text-align:right;" | 21,300,934
| style="text-align:right;" | 100
| style="text-align:right;" | 595
|-
|
| style="text-align:left;" | Abstention: 17.2%
|}

References

1956
1956 elections in France